"England in 1819" is a political sonnet by the English Romantic poet Percy Bysshe Shelley which reflects his liberal ideals.

Background
The poem was composed in 1819, but it was not published until 1839 in the four-volume The Poetical Works of Percy Bysshe Shelley (London: Edward Moxon) edited by Mary Shelley. Like all sonnets, "England in 1819" has fourteen lines and is written in iambic pentameter, but its rhyming scheme (a-b-a-b-a-b, c-d-c-d, c-c-d-d) differs from that of the traditional English sonnet (a-b-a-b, c-d-c-d, e-f-e-f, g-g).

Summary

The sonnet describes a very forlorn reality.
The poem passionately attacks, as the poet sees it, England's decadent, oppressive ruling class. King George III is described as "old, mad, blind, despised, and dying". The "leech-like" nobility ("princes") metaphorically suck the blood from the people, who are, in the sonnet, oppressed, hungry, and hopeless, their fields untilled. Meanwhile, the army is corrupt and dangerous to liberty, the laws are harsh and useless, religion has lost its morality, and Parliament (the "Senate") is a relic. In addition, the civil rights of the Catholic minority are non-existent "Time's worst statute unrepealed". In a startling burst of optimism, the last two lines express the hope that a "glorious Phantom" may spring forth from this decay and "illumine our tempestuous day".

This poem was written as a response to the brutal Peterloo Massacre in August 1819.

References

Sources

Chandler, James. England in 1819: The Politics of Literary Culture and the Case of Romantic Historicism. University of Chicago Press. 1998.
Cox, Jeffrey N. Poetry and Politics in the Cockney School: Keats, Shelley, Hunt and their Circle (Cambridge Studies in Romanticism). Cambridge University Press, 2004.
Duff, David. Romance and Revolution: Shelley and the Politics of a Genre (Cambridge Studies in Romanticism). Cambridge University Press, 2005.
Jost, François. "Anatomy of an Ode: Shelley and the Sonnet Tradition." Comparative Literature, Vol. 34, No. 3 (Summer, 1982), pp. 223–246.
Phillips, Brian. SparkNote on Shelley's Poetry. 18 Aug. 2007.
MacEachen, Dougald B. CliffsNotes on Shelley's Poems. 18 July 2011.
Rumens, Carol. "Poem of the week: England in 1819: This week, a furious sonnet from Shelley whose attack on the ruling classes retains its power two centuries on." Guardian, 23 February 2009.
Stock, Paul. The Shelley-Byron Circle and the Idea of Europe (Palgrave Studies in Cultural and Intellectual History). Palgrave Macmillan, 2010.
Vivante, Leone. "Shelley and the Creative Principle" in Shelley. Ed. George Ridenour. Englewood Cliffs: Prentice-Hall, 1965.
Wasserman, Earl. Shelley: A Critical Reading. Baltimore: Johns Hopkins Press, 1971.
Wasserman, Earl. The Subtler Language. Baltimore, Johns Hopkins Press, 1959.
Wheatley, Kim. Shelley and His Readers: Beyond Paranoid Politics. University of Missouri, 1999.
Wroe, Ann. Being Shelley: The Poet's Search for Himself. Pantheon, 2007.

External links
 Text of poem, with notes, from the University of Toronto
 Summary and commentary on poem from SparkNotes
 UK Guardian, Poem of the Week: "England in 1819".

1819 poems
Poetry by Percy Bysshe Shelley
Works about England